Émile Druart Jr. was a Belgian competitor in the sport of archery.  Druart competed in one event, taking second place in the Sur la Perche à la Herse competition. He is now considered by the International Olympic Committee to have won a silver medal.  No scores are known from that competition, though it is known that Druart tied with Auguste Serrurier and both are silver medallists.

See also
 Archery at the 1900 Summer Olympics

Notes
  - Prizes at the time were silver medals for first place and bronze medals for second, as well as usually including cash awards.  The current gold, silver, bronze medal system was initiated at the 1904 Summer Olympics.  The International Olympic Committee has retroactively assigned medals in the current system to top three placers at early Olympics.

References

External links
 
 

Archers at the 1900 Summer Olympics
Olympic archers of Belgium
Olympic silver medalists for Belgium
Belgian male archers
Year of death missing
Olympic medalists in archery
Year of birth missing
Medalists at the 1900 Summer Olympics
Place of birth missing
Place of death missing